Verónica Tapia-Carreto (born January 12, 1962) is a Mexican composer, long resident in Canada.

Later she attended the Johns Hopkins University. At the University of York her supervisor was Nicola LeFanu; she received her master's degree there in 1996. In 2006 she was awarded a doctoral degree by the University of Calgary, at which she later taught. She has since joined the faculty of the conservatory at Mount Royal University. She has composed chamber music and works for children, as well as for orchestra; she has also written electroacoustic and computer music.

References

1961 births
Living people
Mexican classical composers
Mexican women classical composers
20th-century classical composers
20th-century Mexican musicians
21st-century classical composers
21st-century Mexican musicians
Mexican expatriates in Canada
Johns Hopkins University alumni
Alumni of the University of York
University of Calgary alumni
Academic staff of the University of Calgary
Academic staff of Mount Royal University
People from Puebla (city)
20th-century women composers
21st-century women composers